Ferguson Farm Complex is a historic home and farm complex located at Duanesburg in Schenectady County, in the U.S. state of New York. The house was built about 1848 and is a 2-story, three-bay clapboard-sided frame building in a vernacular Greek Revival style. It has a 2-story, three-bay wing and a 1½-story, two-bay wing. It features a gable roof with cornice returns, a wide frieze, and corner pilasters.  Also on the property are two  contributing barns (a hay barn and a dairy barn), a garage, shed, and silo.

The property was covered in a 1984 study of Duanesburg historical resources.
It was listed on the National Register of Historic Places in 1987.

References

Houses on the National Register of Historic Places in New York (state)
Houses in Schenectady County, New York
Greek Revival houses in New York (state)
Houses completed in 1848
National Register of Historic Places in Schenectady County, New York